The Vegas Golden Knights are a professional ice hockey team based in the Las Vegas metropolitan area. They are members of the Pacific Division of the National Hockey League's (NHL) Western Conference. The Golden Knights franchise has been a part of the NHL since 2017, and plays its home games at T-Mobile Arena on the Las Vegas Strip in Paradise, Nevada.

This is a list of players who have played at least one game for the Vegas Golden Knights.

Key

Statistics are as of the end of the 2021–22 NHL season

Goaltenders

Skaters

Notes
  Save percentage did not become an official NHL statistic until the 1982–83 season. Therefore, goaltenders who played before 1982 do not have official save percentages.
  The "Seasons" column lists the first year of the season of the player's first game and the last year of the season of the player's last game. For example, a player who played one game in the 2000–01 season would be listed as playing with the team in 2000–2001, regardless of what calendar year the game occurred within.

References

Vegas Golden Knights players
 
players